Line 1 of Qingdao Metro is an underground metro line in Qingdao. It crosses Jiaozhou Bay between Fenghuangdao and Tuandao stations by a cross-sea tunnel parallels with the road tunnel.

History
The northern section was opened on 24 December 2020 with 18 stations from Qingdao North Railway Station to Dongguozhuang. Note that section between Xingguo Road and Dongguozhuang is planned to split from line 1 to be the Phase 1 section of line 7 in the future.

The southern section from Wangjiagang to Qingdao North Railway Station opened on December 30, 2021. Xizhen station on the section is not opened.

Opening timeline

Stations

References

Qingdao Metro lines
2020 establishments in China
Railway lines opened in 2020